Marcos Palacios, known professionally as Kosine, is an American music producer. As a member of the production duo Da Internz, Palacios is known for producing songs such as Big Sean's "Dance (A$$)" (2011), Rihanna's "Birthday Cake" (2011), and Nicki Minaj's "Anaconda" (2014). From 2018, Palacios worked as a soundtrack producer for the television series Empire and Star, debuting as an actor on Star. Palacios has worked as a talk show host on BET's Mancave (2018) and Kingz with Kosine (2020).

Life and career 

Palacios was born in Chicago, growing up in neighboring Maywood, Illinois and Broadview, Illinois. After graduating St. Joseph High School in Westchester, Illinois, Palacios moved to Tallahassee, Florida to attend the Florida A&M University, majoring in music. Later transferring to Columbia College Chicago, Palacios formed the idea for his production team, Da Internz, as a part of a class for his Business and Entrepreneurship degree. Palacios, along his production team partner Ernest "Tuo" Clark, moved to Los Angeles in mid-2005, spending time between Los Angeles and Chicago while attempting to break into the music industry. During this period, Palacios was hired by Columbia as a professor, teaching specialized classes in hip-hop beat making and music production.

The duo's first break was produced six songs on rapper Mims' Guilt in 2009,  including the album's lead single "Move (If You Wanna)". The duo went on to produce music for hip-hop, R&B and pop musicians, most notably Big Sean's "Dance (A$$)" (2011), Rihanna's "Birthday Cake" (2011), and the group's most commercially successful song, "Anaconda" by Nicki Minaj (2014), who were asked to add additional drums to the song by Minaj.

Palacios decided to start a solo career in 2014, under the moniker Enrique Dragon, releasing his first single Out Here which was later performed by Luke James on the FOX TV Show Star. In 2015, Palacios moved back to Chicago for a reset from entertainment and returned to Columbia College Chicago as the school's first Artist in Residence. During this period, Palacios gave a TEDx talk on finding success at his alma mater in 2016.

In 2016 when he returned to Los Angeles, Palacios became a host for Beats 1 Radio, and in 2018 started work as a co-host of the BET talk show Mancave, as well as restarting his solo career, now under the name KOSINE (pronounced 'Co-sign'), with the song "Your World" featuring JoJo. From 2018, Palacios began producing music for the Fox television series Empire and Star, and hosted writers camps for songwriters and producers to develop music for Star. For season 3 of Star, Palacios made his acting debut as recurring character Lil' Dini.

In 2020, Palacios worked together with Idris Elba on the song "Kings", which raised money for MusiCares' COVID-19 Relief Fund, produced Kelly Rowland's comeback single "Coffee", and in September produced the music for a major Joe Biden 2020 presidential campaign commercial.

In May 2021, he released his first debut EP album "Truth Serum" over streaming services along with starring in a 28 minute music video visual album/short film of the same name, loosely depicting his struggles of finding himself after 10 years of success in Hollywood, narrating a powerful message in how he persevered above it all. The short film EP was also co-produced by Marcus Paulk of Moesha fame. The exclusive video release premiered on Revolt TV on May 7, 2021.

Personal life

Palacios' father was Guatemalan Olympiad Teodoro Palacios, who immigrated to Chicago in 1970. His mother was originally from Panama.

Filmography

Discography

Albums 

 Truth Serum (2021) - EP Album

Singles

As lead artist

As featured artist

Guest appearances and solo production discography

References

American record producers
Living people
Year of birth missing (living people)
Date of birth missing (living people)